Release Therapy is the fifth studio album by American hip hop recording artist Ludacris. It was released on September 26, 2006, under Disturbing tha Peace and Def Jam South. Production for the album was done by The Neptunes, The Trak Starz, Dre & Vidal, DJ Toomp, The Runners and Polow da Don, and features guest contributions from rappers Young Jeezy, Field Mob, Beanie Sigel, Pimp C and C-Murder and R&B singers Pharrell, Mary J. Blige, R. Kelly and Bobby Valentino.

Release Therapy garnered a generally mixed reception from critics unsure of Ludacris' exploration into more serious content after previous works being more lighthearted and party-filled. The album debuted at number one on the Billboard 200 chart, with sales of 309,000 copies in its first week, and spawned three singles: "Money Maker", "Grew Up a Screw Up" and "Runaway Love". The record received a Grammy Award for Best Rap Album and its lead single "Money Maker" won Best Rap Song at the 49th Annual Grammy Awards in 2007.

Background
Release Therapy won the Best Rap Album award for the 2007 Grammy Awards.

Ludacris also shaved his cornrows off for a new "caesar" haircut.  He said with a new album that was different than his other four albums, there would be a new haircut and a new personality to go with it, similar to what Busta Rhymes did with The Big Bang.

Ludacris released a mixtape called Pre-Release Therapy with DJ Green Lantern and Michael '5000' Watts to precede the album.

Concept

Unlike the previous albums released by Ludacris, Release Therapy has a more mature and serious approach to the music (e.g. the 3rd single "Runaway Love" is Ludacris' first stab at socially concerned music). It is also Ludacris' darkest album to date, both in mood and subject matter. The different approach Ludacris took with Release Therapy has caused many listeners and fans to debate on whether the album is Ludacris's best or worst.

Ludacris also stated that his new album will be somewhat like a tape on CD. "The way we're going to try to format the record is you have your Release side and your Therapy side," he said. "Everybody knows the Release side would be 'War With God,' 'Tell It Like It Is.' I have a record called 'Slap.' Just getting everything off my chest. The Therapy side would be feel-good — a song like 'Woozy' with R. Kelly on it is therapeutic. Even 'Money Maker.' Some women's therapy is getting out, going to the club and shaking they ass. It's therapeutic to them."

Singles
The first single, "Money Maker", which was produced by and features Pharrell, was released to U.S. radio outlets on July 17, 2006. It was a huge success making number 1 on various charts through the U.S.. These charts included the Billboard Hot 100, the Hot R&B/Hip-Hop Songs, Hot Rap Tracks and the Hot 100 Airplay.
The second single is "Grew Up a Screw Up", featuring Young Jeezy. The single dispels rumors that Ludacris and Young Jeezy are having beef with each other.
The third single is "Runaway Love", featuring Mary J. Blige. It peaked at number two on the Billboard Hot 100.

Reception

Critical reception

Release Therapy received generally mixed reviews from music critics divided over Ludacris' foray into more conscious rap territory while still being able to deliver mainstream hip-hop content. At Metacritic, which assigns a normalized rating out of 100 to reviews from mainstream critics, the album received an average score of 60, based on 21 reviews.

In a review for The A.V. Club, writer Nathan Rabin called it "Ludacris' most mature album to date", praising the wordy and energetic party tracks and the surprising foray into introspection later on, concluding that "Always good but seldom great, Release Therapy is the rare major-label rap album that suffers from too much substance. Lyrically and thematically, Ludacris is growing up, so perhaps it's inevitable that he's incurring some growing pains along the way." Robert Christgau gave the album a two-star honorable mention, indicating a "likable effort that consumers attuned to its overriding aesthetic or individual vision may well enjoy." He cited "Tell It Like It Is", "Mouths to Feed" and "Slap" as highlights of Ludacris' transition into more mature content while maintaining his humorous side: "Rap porn clown as rap businessman, a richer choice thematically than rap entertainment mogul or rap crime boss." Brett Johnson of XXL gave praise to Ludacris for having a balanced track list containing his trademark humorous party jams and newfound sociopolitical commentary cuts, calling it "a solid album short on obvious club bangers but long on the more worldly perspective of a rap veteran."

Marisa Brown of AllMusic commended the 'Therapy' half of the album but felt that the 'Release' portion of the tracks was missing some humor, saying that "the witty rhymes that made Chicken-n-Beer so great are in short supply." Entertainment Weeklys Michael Endelman was the opposite in his critique of the record, praising Ludacris for maintaining his lyrical humor and dexterity on tracks like "Ultimate Satisfaction" and "Grew Up a Screw Up", but was less positive towards his attempts at depth on "Runaway Love" and "Do Your Time", saying that "[T]hough well-intentioned, they come across as trite." Pitchfork writer Tom Breihan felt the album was overhyped due to various interviews of Ludacris calling it a classic, resulting in a project with a weak track list structure, diluted punchlines and poor attempts at conscious rap. He gave faint praise to Release Therapy as being "Luda's best album since Back for the First Time, but it's not like that's saying much."

Chart performance
The album debuted at number one on the Billboard 200 chart, selling over 309,000 copies in the first week, making it Ludacris' third number one album in a row. To date, the album has sold about 1.3 million copies.

Track listing

Charts

Weekly charts

Year-end charts

Certifications

See also
 List of Billboard 200 number-one albums of 2006

References

2006 albums
Ludacris albums
Albums produced by Dre & Vidal
Albums produced by the Neptunes
Albums produced by Polow da Don
Albums produced by DJ Toomp
Albums produced by the Runners
Albums produced by Happy Perez
Def Jam Recordings albums
Grammy Award for Best Rap Album
Disturbing tha Peace albums